Southwestern University of Finance and Economics is a station on Line 4 of the Chengdu Metro in China. The station serves the nearby Southwestern University of Finance and Economics.

Station layout

References

Railway stations in Sichuan
Railway stations in China opened in 2015
Chengdu Metro stations